A list of British films released in 1927.

1927

See also
1927 in British music
1927 in British television
1927 in film
1927 in the United Kingdom

References

External links
 

1927
Films
Lists of 1927 films by country or language
1920s in British cinema